A list of Samurai films released in the 2000s.

Western